The Islamic Fayli Grouping in Iraq or Iraqi Faili Islamic Gathering is one of two Iraqi political parties of Shi'a Fayli Kurds, the other being the Fayli Kurd Islamic Union.  The Islamic Fayli Grouping is led by Muqdad Al-Baghdadi.

Both Fayli parties were part of the United Iraqi Alliance coalition in the Iraqi legislative election of January 2005, but the Gathering contested the Iraqi legislative election of December 2005 as part of the Islamic Coalition, which won no seats.

The Islamic Fayli Grouping emerged in the 1990s in the aftermath of the Gulf War, when the Iraqi government cracked down on the Fayli Kurds and other opposition groups. The group has since become an important player in Iraqi politics, particularly in the eastern provinces of Diyala and Wasit, where the Fayli Kurds are concentrated.

The party has participated in Iraqi elections and has formed alliances with other political parties. The group has also sought to build ties with Iran, which has a significant Shia population and has historically supported Shia political groups in Iraq.

References

External links
 Faili Kurds

Shia Islamic political parties
Kurdish Islamic organisations
Kurdish Islamism
Islamic political parties in Iraq